Davenport is a town in Lincoln County, Oklahoma, United States. The population was 814 at the 2010 census.

Geography
Davenport is located at  (35.707463, -96.764583).

Demographics

At the 2000 census there were 881 people, 353 households, and 261 families living in the town. The racial makeup of the town was 85.24% White, 3.41% African American, 6.81% Native American, 0.11% Pacific Islander, 0.57% from other races, and 3.86% from two or more races. Hispanic or Latino of any race were 1.36%.

Of the 353 households 33.4% had children under the age of 18 living with them, 58.4% were married couples living together, 10.2% had a female householder with no husband present, and 25.8% were non-families. 22.7% of households were one person and 10.8% were one person aged 65 or older. The average household size was 2.50 and the average family size was 2.91.

The age distribution was 27.7% under the age of 18, 9.3% from 18 to 24, 27.9% from 25 to 44, 18.4% from 45 to 64, and 16.7% 65 or older. The median age was 34 years. For every 100 females, there were 89.9 males. For every 100 females age 18 and over, there were 85.2 males.

The median household income was $24,205 and the median family income  was $30,329. Males had a median income of $25,972 versus $19,091 for females. The per capita income for the town was $12,438. About 19.5% of families and 23.9% of the population were below the poverty line, including 34.6% of those under age 18 and 13.5% of those age 65 or over.

Notable person 
 Betty Thompson, Miss Oklahoma 2011

References

External links
 City website
 Encyclopedia of Oklahoma History and Culture - Davenport
 Oklahoma Digital Maps: Digital Collections of Oklahoma and Indian Territory

Towns in Lincoln County, Oklahoma
Towns in Oklahoma